Duke E. Cameron is an American cardiac surgeon.  Formerly Chief of Cardiac Surgery at Johns Hopkins University School of Medicine; the James T. Dresher Sr. Professor of Surgery; Director of Pediatric Cardiac Surgery; and Director of The Dana and Albert "Cubby" Broccoli Center for Aortic Diseases , at the Johns Hopkins Hospital, he returned to Hopkins in 2023.  His clinical interests include:
Adult and pediatric cardiac surgery
Cardiac transplantation
Marfan syndrome
Mitral valve repair
Aortic surgery including valve-sparing aortic root replacement
He is the editor, along with Stephen C. Yang, of Current Therapy in Thoracic and Cardiovascular Surgery.

In January 2008, Cameron reported a very large surgical series, the 30-year history of surgical treatment in 372 cases of Marfan syndrome at Johns Hopkins Hospital.

He graduated from Harvard College and Yale School of Medicine.

References

External links
Duke E. Cameron at Johns Hopkins Medicine
Aortic Root Replacement in 372 Marfan Patients: Evolution of Operative Repair Over 30 Years.
Duke Cameron appointed Chief of Cardiac Surgery

Living people
American cardiac surgeons
Johns Hopkins Hospital physicians
Year of birth missing (living people)
Place of birth missing (living people)
Harvard College alumni
Yale School of Medicine alumni
Physicians of Massachusetts General Hospital
Medical journal editors